"Roll On Mississippi" is a song written by Kye Fleming and Dennis Morgan, and recorded by American country music artist Charley Pride. It was released in February 1981 as the second single and title track from his album Roll On Mississippi.  The song peaked at number 7 on the Billboard Hot Country Singles chart.

Chart performance

References

1981 singles
1980 songs
Charley Pride songs
RCA Records singles
Songs written by Dennis Morgan (songwriter)
Songs written by Kye Fleming
Songs about Mississippi